The Commercial and Government Entity Code, or CAGE Code, is a unique identifier assigned to suppliers to various government or defense agencies, as well as to government agencies themselves and various organizations.  CAGE codes provide a standardized method of identifying a given facility at a specific location.

CAGE Codes are used internationally as part of the NATO Codification System (NCS), where they are sometimes called NCAGE Codes.
CAGE codes are referenced in various databases of the NCS, where they are used along with the supplier's part number to form a reference which is held on the National Stock Number (NSN) record.  This reference enables users of the NCS to determine who supplies any given part.

The information associated with the entities - name, address, phone numbers, etc. - is catalogued in the H4 and H8 Handbooks.  The National Codification Bureau (NCB) of each NATO or NATO-sponsored Nation is responsible for maintaining the CAGE code information for entities in these respective countries.  There are on the order of 3 million entities in this catalog, of which around 2.6 million are US entities.

Within the US, any organization wishing to be a supplier to the DoD is issued a CAGE Code by Defense Logistics Information Service (DLIS), the organization serving as the US NCB.  An entity issued a CAGE code must renew it every five years.

CAGE is sometimes expanded as "Commercial Activity/Government Entity", "Contractor And Government Entity", or other, similar variations.  However, according to the DLIS website, "Commercial And Government Entity" is the proper term.  CAGE was previously known as Federal Supply Code for Manufacturers, or FSCM, which was also the National Supply Code for Manufacturer, or NSCM. On older engineering drawings (pre-1980s) it was labeled simply as "Code Ident No" (Code Identification Number).

In the NCS metadata, the CAGE code's Data Record Number (DRN) is 9250 (or 4140 for NSCM); information listed under this DRN identifies very specifically the semantics of CAGE, its syntax, and the procedures associated with it.

Syntax 

CAGE codes are all five characters in length. There is no meaning encoded in the code itself, other than the underlying NCB; it is simply a unique identifier. The Code Chart provided by the NATO AC/135 committee (the group of National Directors on Codification) provides the syntax of CAGE codes in various countries.

See also 
 Data Universal Numbering System (DUNS) - Issued by Dun & Bradstreet; required for certain US government contractors and Federal grant recipients
 DoDAAC - Issued by the US DoD
 Employer Identification Number (EIN) - Issued by US IRS, tax identification number for organizations and employers
 Military logistics
 Trading Partner Identification Number (TPIN)

References

External links

Commercial and Government Entity Program
 SAM.gov (System for Award Management)
 
 

NATO standardisation
Unique identifiers
Company identification numbers